Epacris rigida is a species of flowering plant in the family Ericaceae and is endemic to eastern New South Wales. It is an erect, bushy shrub with elliptic leaves and white or cream-coloured, tube-shaped flowers.

Description
It has softly-hairy branchlets, the stems with conspicuous, more or less triangular leaf scars. The anthers are visible near the end of the petal tube.

Taxonomy and naming
Epacris rigida was first formally described in 1827 by Kurt Sprengel in Systema Vegetabilium from an unpublished description by Franz Sieber.

Distribution and habitat
This epacris grows in heath on exposed sandstone ridges in the Blue Mountains.

References

rigida
Ericales of Australia
Flora of New South Wales
Taxa named by Kurt Polycarp Joachim Sprengel
Plants described in 1827